The following is a list of chronological attacks attributed to the Communist Party of the Philippines (CPP), and its armed wing the New People's Army (NPA) which is a major participant in the Communist rebellion in the Philippines.

List

General list

Assassinations

See also
Timeline of the communist rebellion in the Philippines

References

CPP-NPA